The Offenhauser Racing Engine, or Offy, is a racing engine design that dominated American open wheel racing for more than 50 years and is still popular among vintage sprint and midget car racers.

History

The Offenhauser engine, familiarly known as the "Offy", was an overhead cam monoblock 4-stroke internal combustion engine developed by Fred Offenhauser and Harry Arminius Miller. Originally, it was sold as a marine engine. Miller developed this engine into a twin overhead cam, four-cylinder, four-valve-per-cylinder  racing engine. Variations of this design were used in midgets and sprints into the 1960s, with a choice of carburetion or Hilborn fuel injection. When both Miller and the company to whom he had sold much of the equipment and rights went bankrupt in 1933, Offenhauser opened a shop a block away and bought rights to engines, special tooling and drawings at the bankruptcy auction, and he and other former Miller employees took over production. They and former Miller employee, draftsman Leo Goossen, further developed the Miller engines into the Offenhauser engines.

In 1946, the name Offenhauser and engine designs were sold to Louis Meyer and Dale Drake. It was under Meyer and Drake that the engine dominated the Indianapolis 500 and midget racing in the United States. In 1965, Meyer was bought out by Drake, his wife Eve and their son John. From then until Drake's son John sold the shop to Stewart Van Dyne, the Drake family designed and refined the engine until its final race days.

One of the keys to the Offenhauser engine's success and popularity was its power. A 251.92 cubic inch (4,128.29 cm³) DOHC naturally-aspirated four-cylinder racing Offy with a 15:1 compression ratio and a  bore and stroke could produce  at 6,600 rpm (1.77 hp per cubic inch, 81 kW/L) making it remarkably power-dense. Other variants of the engine produced even higher outputs of 3 hp per cubic inch (137 kW/L), unparalleled for their size and capacity in power-to cubic-inch/cylinder-count ratio. Another reason for the engine's success was its reliability. Its monobloc construction made it immune to head gasket or cylinder stud problems, and allowed for higher cylinder pressures.

From 1934 through the 1970s, the Offenhauser engine dominated American open-wheel racing, winning the Indianapolis 500 27 times. From 1950 through 1960, Offenhauser-powered cars won the Indianapolis 500 and achieved all three podium positions, winning the pole position in 10 of the 11 years.

The Offenhauser shop began to do machine work for Lockheed in 1940, as the arms build-up for anticipated war began.  The last prewar engine was shipped on July 17, 1941, and the plant began producing hydraulic systems after the Pearl Harbor attack. Leo Goossen finally became a full-time Offenhauser employee in 1944, and Fred Offenhauser sold the company in 1946.

In 1959 Lime Rock Park held a famous Formula Libre race, where Rodger Ward shocked the expensive and exotic sports car contingent by beating them on the road course in an Offenhauser powered midget car, which was normally considered competitive on oval tracks only.  On the strength of this performance, the car was entered in the Formula 1 1959 US Grand Prix at Sebring, where it was totally uncompetitive, setting a qualifying time of 3:43.8 compared to the pole time of 3 minutes dead and being the slowest Formula 1 starter at 3:33.4.

When Ford came onto the scene in 1963,  the Offy began to lose its domination over Indy car racing, although it remained a competitive winner on the circuit including at the 500 through the mid-1970s even with the advent of turbocharging. A more powerful turbocharged version of the engine was used by Offenhauser in 1968, and gave Bobby Unser the win that year. The engine made  @ 9,500 rpm, from a displacement of only . The final 2.65-litre four-cylinder Offy, restricted to  boost, produced  at 9,000 rpm. The Offy's final victory came at Trenton in 1978, in Gordon Johncock's Wildcat. The last time an Offy-powered car raced was at Pocono in 1982 for the Domino's Pizza Pocono 500, in an Eagle chassis driven by Jim McElreath, although two Vollstedt chassis with Offenhauser engines failed to qualify for the 1983 Indianapolis 500.

Common Offenhauser engines

Offenhauser produced engine blocks in several sizes.  These blocks could be bored out or sleeved to vary the cylinder bore, and could be used with crankshafts of various strokes, resulting in a wide variety of engine displacements.  Offenhauser (and Meyer-Drake, in later years) frequently made blocks, pistons, rods, and crankshafts to specific customer requests.  However, certain engine sizes were common, and could be considered the "standard" Offenhauser engines:

  - to meet the displacement rule in many midget series
  - displacement rule in AAA (later USAC) sprint cars
  - displacement rule for the Indianapolis 500 under AAA rules
  - for Indianapolis (during the 1930s fuel consumption rules)
  - displacement rule for Indianapolis under USAC rules
  - displacement rule for turbocharged engines at Indianapolis (to 1968)
  - displacement rule for turbocharged engines at Indianapolis (1969 and later)

World Championship Indianapolis 500 summary
From 1950 to 1960, the Indianapolis 500 was a round of the World Drivers' Championship.

See Indianapolis Motor Speedway race results for a more complete list.

In the 11 World Championship years, the Meyer-Drake Offenhauser engine partnered for at least one race with the following 35 constructors:

Adams
Bromme
Christensen
Deidt
Del Roy
Dunn
Eagle
Elder
Epperly
Ewing
Hall
Kurtis Kraft
Kuzma
Langley
Lesovsky
Marchese
Maserati
McLaren
Meskowski
Moore
Nichels
Olson
Pankratz
Pawl
Phillips
Rae
Schroeder
Sherman
Snowberger
Stevens
Sutton
Trevis
Turner
Watson
Wetteroth

Complete Formula One World Championship results
(excluding the 1950-1960 Indianapolis 500) (key)

References

Formula One engine manufacturers
Indianapolis 500
Engine manufacturers of the United States